Jack Meagher (born 23 July 1930) is a former  Australian rules footballer who played with South Melbourne in the Victorian Football League (VFL).

Notes

External links 

Living people
1930 births
Australian rules footballers from Victoria (Australia)
Sydney Swans players
East Ballarat Football Club players